Trophonella longstaffi is a species of sea snail, a marine gastropod mollusk in the family Muricidae, the murex snails or rock snails.

Description

Distribution

References

 Engl W. (2012) Shells of Antarctica. Hackenheim: Conchbooks. 402 pp

External links
  BARCO A., SCHIAPARELLI S., HOUART R., OLIVERIO M. (2012). Cenozoic evolution of Muricidae (Mollusca, Neogastropoda) in the Southern Ocean, with the description of a new subfamily. ZOOLOGICA SCRIPTA, vol. 41, pp. 596–616

Gastropods described in 1907
Trophonella